This List of military awards and decorations of the international military intervention against ISIL is an index to articles on notable military awards presented by the combatants during the International military intervention against ISIL.

International

International fighters and volunteers with the SDF, YPG and YPJ 

  The Medal for the Martyrs

Multinational Force and Observers 

 Multinational Force and Observers Director General's Award
 Multinational Force and Observers Medal
 Multinational Force and Observers Civilian Medal

North Atlantic Treaty Organisation 

  NATO Non-article 5 medal for Operation Resolute Support

United Nations 

  United Nations Medal for the United Nations Truce Supervision Organization
  United Nations Medal for the United Nations Supervision Mission in Syria

Australia 

  Australian Service Medal with Sinai clasp
  Australian Operational Service Medal – Greater Middle East Operation (AOSM-GMEO)
  Australian Operational Service Medal – Special Operations

Belgium 

 Commemorative Medal for Foreign Operations or Missions

Canada 

  General Service Medal (GSM) with Expedition ribbon

Denmark 

  Defense Medal for International Service, Single Deployment
  Defense Medal for International Service, Syria

Germany 

  German Armed Forces Deployment Medal with AF TUR clasp

Iraq 

 Iraq Commitment Medal

New Zealand 

  New Zealand General Service Medal 2002 (Iraq 2015)
  New Zealand General Service Medal 2002 (Greater Middle East)

Norway 

  Medal for Defence Operations Abroad with Iraq ribbon
  Medal for Defence Operations Abroad with Syria ribbon

Russia 

  Medal "Participant in Military Operations in Syria"
 Medal "For the Liberation of Palmyra"
 Medal "For the Demining of Palmyra"

Spain 

  Medalla de Campaña

United Kingdom 

  Operational Service Medal for Afghanistan
  Operational Service Medal Iraq and Syria

United States 

  National Defense Service Medal (NDSM)
  Global War on Terrorism Service Medal (GWOT-SM)
  Afghanistan Campaign Medal (ACM)
 Inherent Resolve Campaign Medal
 Global War on Terrorism Expeditionary Medal (GWOT-EM)

References 

Lists of awards